Bhatapanahalli is a village in the Yelburga taluk of Koppal district in the Indian state of Karnataka.
Bhatapanahalli is 6 km from Kuknoor and 40 km from Gadag. Bhatapanahalli can be reached by Gadag-Kuknoor route via Harlapur-Binnal.

See also
Mandalagiri
Itagi
Kuknoor
Yelburga
Koppal
Karnataka

References

Villages in Koppal district